Sewsunker "Papwa" Sewgolum (OIS) (12 December 1928 – 5 July 1978) was a South African professional golfer of ethnic Indian origin, who carved a niche for himself in golfing folklore when he became the first golfer of colour to win a provincial open in South Africa. He became a symbol of the sports boycott movement when pictures of him receiving his trophy outdoors in the rain were published across the world: due to apartheid, he was not allowed to enter the clubhouse.

Personal life
Sewgolum began his career as a caddie. He had five children with his wife, Suminthra.

Career
Sewgolum was a caddie for amateur golfer Graham Wulff. Impressed by Sewgolum's great talents, Wulff arranged for him to try to qualify for the 1959 Open Championship and participate in the Dutch Open that summer. Sewgolum qualified for the Open Championship when he shot a 71 and won the Dutch Open. He would go on to successfully defend his championship the following year. He was noted for his unconventional grip, holding the club with his right hand above the left.

In 1961, Sewgolum was the first non-white to take part in the South African Open. Just two years after he broke the color barrier he finished second, losing by one shot to Afrikaner Retief Waltman.

Later in 1963, he caused a stir when he beat 103 white golfers, including Harold Henning, at the Natal Open. He was the first non-white person to win an event on the South Africa circuit. He also performed admirably later in the summer at the 1963 Open Championship, shooting 71-74-73-72 to finish in solo 13th. Among the many South African golfers at the event, Gary Player was the only one to score better than Sewgolum, beating him by three shots. It was Sewgolum's best ever finish in a major. The next year he won the Dutch Open for the third and final time. He also won the 1964 Cock of the North, an event in Zambia.

In 1965, he won the Natal Open for the second time, defeating runner-up Gary Player. Even more famous than his victory, however, was the trophy presentation. Sewgolum was forced to accept the trophy outside of Durban Country Club in the rain. Colored and black people were not allowed in the clubhouse, otherwise the club could lose its liquor license. Sewgolum's performance received worldwide attention and was covered by The New York Times. He would return to defend his championship in February 1966 but would finish in fourth place with a score of 292, six behind Player. The following year, in 1967, Sewgolum would nearly win the Dutch Open for the fourth time, finishing two behind England's Peter Townsend. 

In addition to his achievements in mainstream events, Sewgolum was also the winner of a number of non-white golfing championships in South Africa. His success embarrassed the apartheid government, however, and he was ultimately banned from playing golf or even entering a golf course as a spectator. Sewgolum would die impoverished in 1978 at the age of 48.

Professional wins

South African circuit wins (4)
1963 Natal Open, Grand Prix (Royal Durban)
1964 Cock of the North
1965 Natal Open

European circuit wins (3)
1959 Dutch Open
1960 Dutch Open
1964 Dutch Open

Honours and awards 
 Sewgolum received a posthumous achievement award from President Thabo Mbeki in 2003, the Silver Medal in the Order of Ikhamanga.
 Durban has a golf course named after him. The Papwa Sewgolum Municipal Golf Course is an 18-hole flat woodland course situated in the suburb of Reservoir Hills.
 Film: Papwa: The Lost Dream of a South African Golfing Legend (2005)
 Book: Papwa: Golf's Lost Legend (2015) by Maxine Case

Results in major championships

Note: Sewgolum only played in The Open Championship.

CUT = missed the half-way cut
"T" = tied

References

External links
 SAHistory - Sewsunker 'Papwa' Sewgolum

South African male golfers
Recipients of the Order of Ikhamanga
Sportspeople from Durban
South African people of Indian descent
Tamil sportspeople
Sportspeople of Indian descent
1928 births
1978 deaths
Racial segregation
Apartheid in South Africa